Ellis D Fogg was the pseudonym of the Australian artist Roger Foley (born 24 January 1942). Now known as Roger Foley-Fogg, the National Film and Sound Archive has described him as Australia's "most innovative lighting designer and lumino kinetic sculptor." The term Lumino kinetic art was first used in 1966 by Frank Popper, Professor of Aesthetics at the University of Paris.

Early life
Foley was born in Cairns, Queensland and attended Newington College (1957–1959). In the late 1950s he was encouraged by his mother to expand his interest in art, attending Joy and Betty Rainer's art and craft classes in Mosman, experimenting with light and shadow through bathroom glass and with light diffracted through the leaves of trees. In the 1960s he started designing rock concerts and psychedelic light shows. Albie Thoms, founder of rival Lightshow group UBU, said "Fogg is later recognised as Sydney's leading lightshow artist". His experimental light shows incorporating his Light Sculpture - Lumino Kinetic sculpture through to the 1970s were precursors to present multi-media installation.

Yellow House
He was one of a group of artists who worked and exhibited at the Yellow House Artist Collective in Potts Point. The Yellow House was founded by artist Martin Sharp and between 1970 and 1973 was a piece of living art and a mecca to pop art. The canvas was the house itself and almost every wall, floor and ceiling became part of the gallery. Many well-known artists, including George Gittoes, Brett Whiteley, Peter Kingston, Albie Thoms and Greg Weight, helped to create the multi-media performance art space that may have been Australia's first 24-hour-a-day happening.

Current work
In 2022 Foley Fogg was engaged to produce Lightshows for BLUESFEST 2022 and for NIMBIN ROOTS FESTIVAL 2022.

References

Bibliography
 Mr Fogg's Music Hall, Jim Anderson (2007)
 Teen Riots to Generation X - The Australian Rock Audience, Peter Cox & Louise Douglas (Powerhouse Publishing, 1993)
 The Real Thing: Adventures in Australian Rock & Roll, Toby Creswell & Martin Fabinyi (Random House, 1999)
 Festival and Event Management, I McDonnell, J Allen & W O'Toole (Jacaranda Wiley Ltd, 1999) pp 252–253 & 258
 Ubu Films - Sydney Underground Movies 1965-1970, Peter Mudie (UNSW Press, 1997)
 Polemics for a New Cinema, Albie Thoms (Wild and Wooley, 1977)
 Recollections of a Bleeding Heart, Don Watson (Random House 2002) pp 333–337
 Kevin Kearney - Audio Artist, Sound Designer, Analogue Location Sound Recordist Vol. One, Brody T. Lorraine (iUniverse, USA, 2007) pp 91 & 107

External links
 Still Turned On: Illuminating the many facets of light artist Roger Foley-Fogg, OZARTS Magazine, Autumn Edition, 2014, by Julian Leatherdale.

1942 births
Living people
Australian artists
Psychedelic artists
People educated at Newington College